Great Cacapon is a census-designated place (CDP) in Morgan County in the U.S. state of West Virginia's Eastern Panhandle. As of the 2010 census, its population was 386.

Great Cacapon takes its name from the Cacapon River (from the Native American meaning "medicine water") which empties into the Potomac River to the town's east. It was originally known as Cacapon Depot on the Baltimore and Ohio Railroad mainline when a post office was established here in 1848. In 1876, its name was changed to Great Cacapon to differentiate it from Little Cacapon which was also on the B&O mainline. It lies four miles down Cacapon Mountain from the Panorama Overlook along Cacapon Road (West Virginia Route 9) west of Berkeley Springs.

References

External links 
 Great Cacapon on the Washington Heritage Trail

Baltimore and Ohio Railroad
West Virginia populated places on the Potomac River
Census-designated places in Morgan County, West Virginia
Census-designated places in West Virginia